Sapulu is a village at the east side of Savai'i island in Samoa. The village is part of the electoral constituency (Faipule District) Fa'asaleleaga 1 which is within the larger political district (Itumalo) of Fa'asaleleaga.

The population is 1,221.

References

Populated places in Fa'asaleleaga